The village  of Mangrul is in Tuljapur tehsil in Osmanabad district in the Indian state of Maharashtra. Mangrul is known for Chincheshwar Temple in center of village. In mungrul "Lord Shani- Maruti" temple is located at North-East side of village. Mangrul is 11 km away from Tuljapur and Bus Transport is available from tuljapur to Mangrul.
In Mangrul, there are Zilla Parishad Primary School (Std. 1 to 7) and High School (std. 5 to 10).

List of sarpanchs i.e. chiefs of the village from the beginning of "panchayat raj" i.e. Gram panchayat in Mangrul

Villages in Sangli district